The United States had an offensive biological weapons program from 1943 until 1969. Today, the nation is a member of the Biological Weapons Convention and has renounced biological warfare.

Agencies and organizations

Military and government agencies and schools
United States Army Biological Warfare Laboratories (USBWL)
United States Army Chemical Corps
War Bureau of Consultants
War Research Service

Biological weapons program locations
United States biological weapons program
Dugway Proving Ground
Granite Peak Range
Edgewood Arsenal
Fort Detrick and the U.S. Army Biological Warfare Laboratories
Building 470
One-Million-Liter Test Sphere
Fort Douglas, Utah
Deseret Test Center
Fort Terry/Plum Island Animal Disease Center
Building 101
Building 257
Horn Island Testing Station
Pine Bluff Arsenal
Rocky Mountain Arsenal
Vigo Ordnance Plant

Treaties, laws and policies
Biological Weapons Convention
Geneva Protocol
Statement on Chemical and Biological Defense Policies and Programs

Weapons

Canceled weapons
E77 balloon bomb
E99 bomblet
Flettner rotor, an experimental biological cluster bomb sub-munition
Project St. Jo
SPD Mk I, 4 lb. World War II-era biological bomb

Other weapons
20 mm particulate projectile
E120 bomblet
[50 lb. cluster bomb, held 544 bomblets
E14 munition, sub-munition for E86 cluster bomb
E23 munition, sub-munition for E77 cluster bomb
E48 particulate bomb (E48R2), sub-munition for E96 cluster
E61 bomb (E61R4)
E86 cluster bomb
E95 bomblet
E96 cluster bomb
M114 bomb, 4 lb. biological anti-personnel bomb, sub-munition for the M33 cluster bomb
M115 bomb, a 500 lb. anti-crop bomb
M143 bomblet
M33 cluster bomb
SUU-24/A dispenser

Weaponized biological agents
anthrax, caused by Bacillus anthracis
Ames strain
tularemia, caused by Francisella tularensis
brucellosis, caused by Brucella suis
Q-fever, caused by Coxiella burnetii
botulism
Staphylococcal Enterotoxin B (SEB), toxin produced by Staphylococcus aureus, used as an incapacitating agent
Stem rust, both wheat and rye stem rust, fungal anticrop agent
Rice blast, fungal anticrop agent

Researched biological agents
Argentinian hemorrhagic fever (AHF)
Bird flu
Bolivian hemorrhagic fever (BHF)
Chikungunya virus (CHIKV)
Dengue fever
Eastern equine encephalitis (EEE) 
Hantavirus
Lassa fever
Late blight of potato
glanders
melioidosis
Newcastle disease
Plague
Psittacosis
Smallpox
Ricin (technically a chemical weapon)
Rift Valley fever (RVF)
Rinderpest
Typhus
Western equine encephalitis (WEE)
Yellow fever

Operations and exercises
Edgewood Arsenal experiments
Operation Big Buzz
Operation Big Itch
Operation Blue Skies
Operation Dark Winter
Operation Dew
Operation Drop Kick
Operation LAC
Operation Magic Sword
Operation May Day
Operation Polka Dot
Operation Top Off
Operation Whitecoat
Project 112
Project Bacchus
Project Clear Vision
Project Jefferson

Biological attacks
1984 Rajneeshee bioterror attack
1989 California medfly attack
2001 anthrax attacks
2003 ricin letters

See also
List of U.S. chemical weapons topics
United States and weapons of mass destruction

References
"Chemical and Biological Weapons: Possession and Programs Past and Present", James Martin Center for Nonproliferation Studies, Middlebury College, April 9, 2002, accessed November 12, 2008.
"Biological Weapons", Federation of American Scientists, updated October 19, 1998, accessed November 12, 2008.
Croddy, Eric C. and Hart, C. Perez-Armendariz J., Chemical and Biological Warfare, (Google Books), Springer, 2002, pp. 30–31,.
Kirby, Reid. "The CB Battlefield Legacy: Understanding the Potential Problem of Clustered CB Weapons", Army Chemical Review, pp. 25–29, July–December 2006, accessed November 12, 2008.
Kirby, Reid. "The Evolving Role of Biological Weapons", Army Chemical Review, pp. 22–26, July–December 2007, accessed November 12, 2008.

United States military
Biological warfare